Diep River may refer to:

 Diep River
 Diep River (Limpopo)
 Diep River, Cape Town

Other 
 Diep River Fynbos Corridor

See also 
 Diep, a 2005 Dutch drama film